S.V.Chetty was a head teacher of schools in the Fiji Islands.

Biography

He was founding head teacher of Nadroga Sangam School and a principal of the multiracial Namaka Public School in Nadi, where he left a legacy of establishing a model for racial integration.

He introduced Ratu Sukuna Day as a school event to celebrate a national hero.

Sporting career
Mr. Chetty was a sportsman and soccer administrator at the district and the national levels.

At the National level, he was a referee, team selector and Public Relations for international test matches and served on several committees as vice president of Fiji Football. He was technical advisor to the FIJI team at the South Pacific Games 1971. The Nadi Soccer Association won the IDC for the first time under his presidency in 1969 and a second time in 1971. He was chairman of the Nadi Teachers Union and personnel officer and executive of the Fiji Teachers Union. He was a councillor for the Nadi Town Council and contested the Nadi Open seat as an NLUP candidate in the 2001 elections.

Mr. Chetty was an active social and community leader both in Nadi and nationally. He was afounding member and later a trustee and a chairman of the Nadi Bula Festival. He was Golden Jubilee secretary for the TISI Sangam.

He was recipient of the Medal of the Order of Fiji, Justice of Peace and the Telugu Pride Award from the Delhi Telugu Academy, India for his community service. He served the community as a Lion and Rotarian.

References

Fijian educators
Living people
Year of birth missing (living people)
Place of birth missing (living people)
Fijian people of Indian descent
People from Nadi
20th-century Fijian educators